Ralf Rothmann (born May 10, 1953 in Schleswig, Schleswig-Holstein) is a German novelist, poet, and dramatist. His novels have been translated into several languages, with Knife Edge (Messers Schneide) and Young Light (Junges Licht) being translated into English.
The main subjects of his work are the bourgeois and proletarian realities of life in the Ruhr area (e.g., Stier, Wäldernacht, Milch und Kohle) as well as Berlin (Flieh mein Freund, Hitze, Feuer brennt nicht), with an autobiographically colored focus on alienation, the attempt to escape these situations, and common solitude. Feuer brennt nicht (2009) is a moving portrait of an artist-writer torn between two women paying a high price for infidelity. It is now (2012) available in English translation as Fire doesn't burn, published by Seagull Books.

Works 
 Messers Schneide (stories). 1986.  - engl. edition as Knife Edge. 1992
 Kratzer und andere Gedichte (poems). 1987. 
 Der Windfisch (story). 1988. 
 Stier (novel). 1991. 
 Wäldernacht (novel). 1994. 
 Berlin Blues. Ein Schauspiel (play). 
 Flieh, mein Freund! (novel). 1998. 
 Milch und Kohle (novel). 2000. 
 Gebet in Ruinen (poems). 2000. 
 Ein Winter unter Hirschen (stories). 2001. 
 Hitze (novel). 2003. 
 Junges Licht (novel). 2004.  - engl. edition Young Light. 2010 
 Rehe am Meer (stories). 2006. 
 Feuer brennt nicht (novel). 2009.  - engl. edition Fire Doesn't Burn. Seagull Books, 2012
 Im Frühling sterben (novel). 2015.  - engl. edition To Die in Spring. Farrar, Straus and Giroux, 2017
 Der Gott jenes Sommers (novel). 2018.

Awards 

1986:  for Kratzer
1992: 
1992/1993: Stadtschreiber von Bergen
1996: 
2001: Hermann-Lenz-Preis
2002: Kranichsteiner Literaturpreis
2003: Evangelischer Buchpreis
2004: Wilhelm-Raabe-Literaturpreis
2004: Rheingau Literatur Preis, Wilhelm Raabe Literature Prize
2005: Heinrich-Böll-Preis
2006: Max Frisch Prize of the City of Zürich
2007: Erik-Reger-Preis
2008: Literaturpreis der Konrad-Adenauer-Stiftung
2008: Hans Fallada Prize
2010: 
2013: Friedrich-Hölderlin-Preis of the City of Bad Homburg
2014: 
2016: Stefan-Andres-Preis
2017: Kleist Prize
2017: Gerty-Spies-Literaturpreis
2018: Premio San Clemente (Spain)
2018: Uwe Johnson Prize
2018: HWA Gold Crown for Historical Fiction (England)

External links 
 Ralf Rothmann in: NRW Literatur im Netz

Web sources 

1953 births
Living people
People from Schleswig, Schleswig-Holstein
German male writers
Kleist Prize winners